The Avalanche is the tenth studio album by American musician Mike Kinsella, under the solo project Owen. It was released on June 19, 2020 under Polyvinyl Record Co.

Release
On May 7, 2020, Kinsella announced the release of the album, alongside the first track "A New Muse". The second single "On With The Show" was released on May 28, 2020.

Critical reception
The Avalanche was met with "universal acclaim" reviews from critics. At Metacritic, which assigns a weighted average rating out of 100 to reviews from mainstream publications, this release received an average score of 83, based on 7 reviews. Aggregator Album of the Year gave the album 79 out of 100 based on a critical consensus of 7 reviews.

Track listing

References

2020 albums
Owen (musician) albums
Polyvinyl Record Co. albums